Shaikh Aasif Shaikh Rashid is an Indian politician from Maharashtra.He is a first term Member of the Maharashtra Legislative Assembly.He won from the Malegaon Central (Vidhan Sabha constituency)  in the 2014 Maharashtra Assembly election.

Positions held 

Maharashtra Legislative Assembly MLA
Terms in office: 2014-2019

References

Living people
Maharashtra MLAs 2014–2019
Indian Muslims
Indian National Congress politicians
Marathi politicians
Year of birth missing (living people)